Lancashire County Cricket Club is one of the eighteen member clubs of the English County Championship, representing the historic county of Lancashire. The club was established on 12 January 1864 and has competed in first-class cricket from 1865, List A cricket from 1963 and Twenty20 cricket from 2003. Unlike most professional sports, in which a team usually has a single fixed home ground, county cricket clubs have traditionally used different grounds in various towns and cities within or close to the county for home matches, although the use of minor "out grounds" away from the club's main headquarters has diminished since the 1980s.

Old Trafford in Manchester has played host to the club's first home fixtures in all three formats of the game; in first-class cricket in 1865 against Middlesex; in List A cricket in 1963 against Leicestershire; and in Twenty20 cricket against Yorkshire in 2003. Lancashire have played home matches at fifteen different grounds, but have played the majority of their home fixtures at Old Trafford, which also hosts Test, One Day International and Twenty20 International cricket matches. Two matches in the 2020 Bob Willis Trophy had to be played at 'neutral' venues due to Old Trafford being used for International cricket during the COVID-19 pandemic and the need for a bio-secure bubble.

Grounds
Below is a complete list of grounds used by Lancashire County Cricket Club (LCCC) for first-class, List A and Twenty20 matches to the end of the 2020 season. Only matches played by LCCC are recorded in the table. Matches not involving LCCC are mentioned in the notes. Lancashire played two home fixtures at neutral venues in the 2020 Bob Willis Trophy due to Covid Protocols and International Cricket at Old Trafford.

Notes
A.  First-class cricket matches are designed to be contested over three or more days, with each team permitted two innings with no limit to the number of overs in an innings. List A matches, also known as limited overs or one-day matches, are intended to be completed in a single day and restrict each team to a single innings of between 40 and 60 overs, depending on the specific competition. Twenty20 matches restrict each team to a single innings of 20 overs.

B.  England have played Test matches at Old Trafford since 1884 and the ground has also been used as the home venue for first-class teams billed as England XI, the All-England Eleven, The North, Gentlemen of the North and A. Shrewsbury's Australian Team. Other matches there have been Test Trials and internationals not involving England. Only the first-class matches played at the ground by Lancashire are included in the totals.

References

Lancashire County Cricket Club
Cricket grounds in Lancashire
Lancashire
Lancashire-related lists